C. H. Ostenfeld Nunatak is a nunatak in King Christian X Land, East Greenland. Administratively it falls under the Northeast Greenland National Park zone.

This geographic feature was named by Lauge Koch during his 1929–30 expeditions after Danish botanist Carl Hansen Ostenfeld (1873–1931), author of Flora of Greenland and its origin.

Geography
It is a relatively large nunatak located east of Stenoland between the Wordie Glacier and the Granta Glacier. Its northern end lies 9 km to the east of Faraway How's eastern point.

See also
List of nunataks of Greenland

References

C. H.